Amphiachyris dracunculoides, commonly called broomweed, is a North American species of flowering plants in the family Asteraceae. It is native to the United States, primarily the southern Great Plains from Missouri to eastern New Mexico.

Amphiachyris dracunculoides is a tall annual herb occasionally reaching as much as 200 cm (7 feet) in height. Flowers are yellow, with both ray florets and disc florets. It is found in calcareous areas, and is tolerant of disturbed habitats.

References

Astereae
Plants described in 1836
Flora of the United States